is a Japanese actor and singer. He is mostly famous for having portrayed Eikichi Onizuka in the 1998 live-action drama adaptation of the popular manga series Great Teacher Onizuka, and the assassin O in Hong Kong action film Fulltime Killer.

While he mainly works as an actor, he has released serval singles and albums over the years. On February 21, 2001, he married actress Nanako Matsushima who he co-starred with in Great Teacher Onizuka.  On May 31, 2004, his wife gave birth to a baby girl. The couple had a second daughter on November 30, 2007.

In 2005 he starred in the movie Otoko-tachi no Yamato.

Filmography

TV Dramas
 Aibō (2015 TV Asahi) as Wataru Kaburagi
 Yae no Sakura (2013 NHK) as Iwao Oyama
 Saikō no Jinsei no Owarikata: Ending Planner (2012 TBS)
 Good Life~Arigato,Papa. Sayonara~ (2011 Fuji TV)
 Lotto 6 de San-oku Ni-senman En Ateta Otoko (2008 TV Asahi)
 Dream Again (2007 NTV)
 14 Sai no Haha episodes 10–11 (2006 NTV)
 Sengoku Jieitai: Sekigahara no Tatakai (2006 NTV) as Lt. Akiyoshi Iba
 Rokusen Nin no Inochi no Visa (2005 YTV)
 HOTMAN 2 (2004 TBS)
 Sheeraza Do (2004 NHK)
 Wonderful Life (2004 Fuji TV)
 Hotman (2003 TBS)
 Ryuuten no Ouhi - Saigo no Koutei (2003 TV Asahi)
 Double Score (2002 Fuji TV)
 Toshiie to Matsu (2002 NHK) as Oda Nobunaga
 Number One (2001 TBS)
 Love Complex (2000 Fuji TV)
 Cheap Love (1999 TBS)
 Over Time (1999 Fuji TV)
 Great Teacher Onizuka (1998 Fuji TV)
 Beach Boys (1997 Fuji TV)
 Virgin Road (1997 Fuji TV)
 Tsubasa wo Kudasai (1996 Fuji TV)
 Miseinen (1995 TBS)
 Ryoma ni omakase (1995 NTV)
  (1995 TBS)
  (1995 TBS)
  (1994 TBS)

Movies
 The Man Who Won 320 Million Yen (xxxx)
 Fly Boys, Fly! (1995)
 Great Teacher Onizuka (1999)
 Fulltime Killer (2001)
 13 Kaidan The Thirteen Steps (2003)
 Otoko-tachi no Yamato (2005)
 The Blue Wolf: To the Ends of the Earth and Sea (2007) as Genghis Khan
 The Liar and His Lover (2013)
 Hot Gimmick: Girl Meets Boy (2019)
 Mio's Cookbook (2020) as Mizuhara Tōzai

Anime
Doraemon (2018) as Wataru Kaburagi

Discography

Studio albums
 Message (メッセージ) (September 10, 1997)
 High Life (September 18, 1998)
 Soul (December 6, 2000)

Singles
 Forever (July 30, 1997)
 as Takashi Sorimachi with Richie Sambora
 One (April 15, 1998)
 Poison (POISON ~言いたい事も言えないこんな世の中は~) (July 29, 1998)
 Free (November 1, 2000)

Compilations 
 Best of My Time (March 17, 1999)
 Best of Best (June 7, 2006)
 Golden ☆ Best (December 8, 2010)

External links 
 Takashi Sorimachi's official site at Ken-on
 Takashi Sorimachi's profile and bio

Biography at Japan-Zone
 

Japanese male actors
1973 births
Living people
People from Saitama (city)
Japanese male pop singers
21st-century Japanese singers
21st-century Japanese male singers
Universal Music Japan artists
Mercury Records artists